Hettich is a German surname. Notable people with the surname include:

Ernest L. Hettich (1897–1973), American academic
Georg Hettich (born 1978), German Nordic combined skier
Urban Hettich (born 1953), West German Nordic combined skier

Businesses 

 Hettich (company)

German-language surnames